Jack Coan (born December 8, 1998) is an American football quarterback for the San Antonio Brahmas of the XFL. He played college football for Wisconsin and Notre Dame.

High school and college career
Born in Sayville, New York, Coan went to Sayville High School, and in 2017 he decided to commit to the University of Wisconsin to play football. After three seasons Coan was finally the starter for Wisconsin, before suffering an injury that sidelined him for the whole of the 2020 season. He would announce his transfer as a graduate student to the University of Notre Dame, where he was subsequently named the starting quarterback. He would enter the 2022 NFL Draft the following year.

Statistics

Professional career

Indianapolis Colts
Coan signed with the Indianapolis Colts as an undrafted free agent on May 13, 2022. He was waived on August 30, 2022.

San Antonio Brahmas
On November 17, 2022, Coan was picked up by the San Antonio Brahmas of the XFL after the 2023 XFL Draft.

Career statistics

Regular season

References

External links
 Notre Dame Fighting Irish bio

1998 births
Living people
American football quarterbacks
Notre Dame Fighting Irish football players
People from Sayville, New York
Players of American football from New York (state)
Wisconsin Badgers football players
Indianapolis Colts players
San Antonio Brahmas players